Ramesh Jena (born 2 November 1940) is a leader of Indian National Congress and a former member of the Odisha Legislative Assembly. He was the MLA of Anugul Legislative assembly from 1995 to 2000.

References

Indian National Congress politicians
Odisha MLAs 2009–2014
Living people
Indian prisoners and detainees
Crime in Odisha
Odisha MLAs 2019–2024
1940 births
Indian National Congress politicians from Odisha